The Buick Skyhawk is an automobile produced by Buick in two generations for the 1975 through 1989 model years.

The first generation (1975-1980) were two-door hatchbacks using the subcompact, rear-wheel drive H-body platform, a badge engineered entry-level version of the Chevrolet Monza, which was based on the Chevrolet Vega while the only engine available was a V6.

Introducing a subcompact was a new approach for Buick and GM, with a similar approach from Oldsmobile with the Starfire hatchback.

The second generation (1982-1989) Skyhawks were built on the compact, front-wheel drive J-car platform that was available in four body styles: two-door sedan and hatchback, as well as four-door sedan and station wagon — manufactured alongside its rebadged variants, the Chevrolet Cavalier, Cadillac Cimarron, Oldsmobile Firenza, and Pontiac J2000/2000/Sunbird at GM's South Gate Assembly and Janesville Assembly plants.



First generation (1975–1980)

The "first generation" Buick Skyhawk is a subcompact, four passenger, hatchback automobile that was introduced September 1974, and produced for the 1975 through 1980 model years. It was
based on the Chevrolet Vega, and shares its wheelbase and width. The Skyhawk was produced with H-body variants Chevrolet Monza, Oldsmobile Starfire, and Pontiac Sunbird. In North America, it competed with other small sporty cars, such as the Toyota Celica, Datsun 200SX, VW Scirocco, Mercury Capri, and the Ford Mustang II. The Buick Skyhawk was the smallest car to wear the Buick badge in more than 60 years.

Overview

The Skyhawk has a  wheelbase and a  width. The Skyhawk, Chevrolet Monza, and Oldsmobile Starfire were among the first vehicles to adopt the newly approved quad rectangular headlamps. The body style is noted for having a resemblance to the Ferrari 365 GTC/4. The Skyhawk is a rear-wheel drive vehicle with a live rear axle design. Throughout its production, the H-body Skyhawk was offered only with the Buick-designed 3.8 liter (231 cid) V6 engine, using a two-barrel carburetor that generated  at 4000 rpm in comparison to its siblings which offered a variety of engines. A four-speed manual transmission was standard; with a three-speed automatic offered as an option. The front suspension is short and long control arms with coil springs, and anti-roll bar; the rear suspension is a torque-arm design with coil springs and an anti-roll bar. Its design was later incorporated into GM's third- and fourth-generation F-bodied (Camaro and Firebird). Variable-ratio power steering was standard and of a recirculating ball design. The brake system features standard power assist including front disc brakes with solid rotors, and rear drum brakes.

Changes

Following the introduction of the Skyhawk, in mid-1975, it was joined by a lower-priced and less well-equipped Skyhawk S.

In 1976, a five-speed manual transmission became available as an option. Starting with the 1976 models, the front and rear disc rotors were of the vented type. Another new option was the Astroroof, which was a large, heavily tinted, overhead glass roof combined with a wide aluminum band that extended from one B-pillar across the roof to the opposite B-pillar.  In 1977, a conventional sliding sunroof became optional and also could be ordered with the aluminum band.

To commemorate the Bicentennial of the United States, the standard colors available on all Buicks were Judicial Black, Liberty White, Pewter Gray, Potomac Blue, Continental Blue, Concord Green, Constitution Green, Mount Vernon Cream, Buckskin Tan, Musket Brown, Boston Red and Independence Red, with specially available colors on select models Congressional Cream, Revere Red, Colonial Yellow and Firecracker Orange.

For the 1979 model year, the Skyhawk received a facelift that incorporated single rectangular headlamps, replacing the previous dual rectangular headlamps that all models had used.  A new option was the "Road Hawk" package that included a Rallye ride and handling package consisting of larger front and rear stabilizer bars, larger tires, and special interior and exterior trim. There was also a "Skyhawk Designers' Accent Edition" that was primarily an exterior trim package available in bright yellow or red with black trim.

There were few changes for 1980, the last model year for the GM H-body platform, most notably the discontinuance of the five-speed manual transmission as an option and revisions to the interior decor. Only the four-speed manual and three-speed automatic transmissions were offered for 1980.

The Skyhawk and Starfire failed to achieve the sales success of the Monza and Sunbird possibly because small sporty coupes seemed out-of-place in a Buick or Oldsmobile showroom. They were discontinued on December 21, 1979, to allow for more production of Monza and Sunbird hatchbacks.

A total of 125,311 H-body Skyhawks were produced in six model years.

See also 
General Motors H-platform
Chevrolet Vega

Second generation (1982–1989)

The 1982–1989 front-wheel drive Skyhawk (J-body) debuted in February, at the 1982 Chicago Auto Show. The Skyhawk was originally available as a two-door and four-door sedan in both Custom and Limited trim packages. The standard engine was a corporate 1.8 liter "122" OHV carbureted four-cylinder (88 hp), with a Brazilian-built 1.8 liter overhead-cam TBI four (84 hp) as an option. A carbureted, 90 hp OHV two-liter also appeared soon after the Skyhawk went on sale, along with an optional five-speed manual. The 1982 Skyhawk Limited sedan was listed at $7,931 ($ in  dollars ) before optional equipment. The suspension was shared with the front-wheel-drive Skylark and Century, which consisted of MacPherson struts, lower control arms, coil springs and a stabilizer bar for the front, and a torsion-beam rear axle, along with coil springs and rear stabilizer bars. The unique dashboard unit was shared only with the Oldsmobile Firenza.

The Skyhawk was an entry-level compact platform for a luxury brand, Buick, and was a refocused effort from the previous generation introduced. It followed many economic factors. The United States had entered into a recession, following the effects of the 1970s energy crisis, and the United States Congress having passed the Energy Policy and Conservation Act, establishing Corporate Average Fuel Economy standards. Sales of large luxury sedans declined in favor of smaller, fuel efficient products with luxury features installed. Smaller luxury vehicles were imported into North America from both Europe and Japan, and GM responded with a small luxury sedan that included power windows, power adjustable drivers seat, air conditioning, upgraded stereo system, available automatic transmission, velour cloth interiors and other appearance features. The station wagon was available with 60/40 split folding second row seat to accommodate passengers and cargo.

For 1983, the Chevrolet-built OHV 1.8 was replaced by a Chevrolet-built OHV 2.0 with 86 hp. A four-door station wagon was also introduced, Buick's first front-wheel drive wagon. The next year there was a minor facelift, with bigger cooling openings and larger bumper rub strips. Shortly after the introduction of the '84s, a turbocharged MPFI version of the Brazilian 1.8 became available on the T-Type model, offering a hefty ,  of torque and the performance oriented Gran Touring suspension, provided by a Garrett T25 turbocharger and shared with the Pontiac Sunbird GT, but was only offered in the two-door coupe or hatchback, and the turbo T-Type was not available with the five-speed manual. The turbocharged engine was optional on the T-Type trim package, and was listed at $800 ($ in  dollars ). The Skyhawk set a sales record in 1984 with 134,076 built. There was not much change for 1985, but for 1986 a new two-door hatchback was added, in "Sport" or T-Type trim. Also, the 2.0 now had 88 hp.

The 1.8-liter engines were replaced by two SOHC multi-port injected 2.0 liter versions for 1987, one naturally aspirated (96 hp/71 kW) and one  turbocharged version known as RPO LT3. The OHV two-liter remained, still with 88 hp. For 1988, only Skyhawk Sports remained, and the hatchback was discontinued. There was also a "Sport S/E" two-door coupe. The OHV and turbocharged engines were no longer available.

Starting in 1986 the front facia was updated with a more rounded appearance, and the T-Type and Limited coupes, sedans, station wagons and hatchbacks received headlight covers that concealed dual sealed beam halogen headlights that retracted underneath the headlights, while the base model had exposed headlights.

1989 was to be the last year of the Skyhawk, but nonetheless the car received updates such as standard electronic fuel injection, better acoustical insulation and body colored door and window frames on the station wagon. The only engine was the Chevrolet OHV two-liter, now with 90 hp. A total of 23,366 of the 1989s were built, for a total of 529,564 second generation Skyhawks.

The Skyhawk, along with the variant Oldsmobile Firenza, were built in Leeds, next of Kansas City, Missouri from 1982 through 1988. 1988 was the last year of Oldsmobile Firenza production  and Leeds Assembly was then closed. For 1989, GM moved Skyhawk production to its Janesville, Wisconsin, assembly plant. Production of the Skyhawk ceased after the 1989 model year. The Chevrolet Cavalier was also produced at Leeds for some of these model years.

The Skyhawk was the last Buick vehicle to offer a manual transmission option, until the introduction of the Opel Insignia-based 2011 Buick Regal Turbo.

Production figures:

Engines
 1982: 1.8 L L46 carbureted OHV I4
 1982–1986: 1.8 L LH8 TBI SOHC I4
 1983–1986: 2.0 L LQ5 TBI OHV I4
 1984–1986: 1.8 L LA5 turbocharged MPFI SOHC I4, 150 hp
 1987–1988: 2.0 L LT2 TBI SOHC I4
 1987: 2.0 L LT3 turbocharged MPFI SOHC I4, 165 hp
 1987, 1989: 2.0 L LL8 TBI OHV I4

Citations

External links

 H-Body FAQ

Skyhawk
Rear-wheel-drive vehicles
Compact cars
Subcompact cars
Coupés
Hatchbacks
Sedans
Station wagons
Cars introduced in 1975
1980s cars
Motor vehicles manufactured in the United States
Front-wheel-drive sports cars